The 1890 Mid Tipperary by-election was a parliamentary by-election held for the United Kingdom House of Commons constituency of Mid Tipperary on 15 May 1890. The vacancy arose because of the resignation of the sitting member, Thomas Mayne of the Irish Parliamentary Party. Only one candidate was nominated, Henry Harrison of the Irish Parliamentary Party, who was elected unopposed.

References

1890 elections in the United Kingdom
May 1890 events
By-elections to the Parliament of the United Kingdom in County Tipperary constituencies
Unopposed ministerial by-elections to the Parliament of the United Kingdom in Irish constituencies
1890 elections in Ireland